The 2013 Challenger La Manche was a professional tennis tournament played on indoor hard courts. It was the 20th edition of the tournament which was part of the 2013 ATP Challenger Tour. It took place in Cherbourg, France between February 25 and March 3, 2013.

ATP entrants

Seeds

 Rankings are as of February 18, 2013.

Other entrants
The following players received wildcards into the singles main draw:
  David Guez
  Jules Marie
  Axel Michon
  Alexandre Sidorenko

The following players received entry from the qualifying draw:
  Andreas Beck
  Márton Fucsovics
  Henri Laaksonen
  Constant Lestienne

The following players received entry as lucky losers:
  Jonathan Eysseric
  Jesse Huta Galung
  Philipp Oswald

Doubles main-draw entrants

Seeds

1 Rankings as of February 18, 2013.

Other entrants
The following pairs received wildcards into the doubles main draw:
  Antione Benneteau /  Jonathan Eysseric
  Nicolas Devilder /  Alexandre Sidorenko

The following pair received entry using a protected ranking:
  Andreas Beck /  Jan-Lennard Struff

Champions

Singles

 Jesse Huta Galung def.  Vincent Millot, 6–1, 6–3

Doubles

 Sanchai Ratiwatana /  Sonchat Ratiwatana def.  Philipp Marx /  Florin Mergea, 7–5, 6–4

External links
Official Website

Challenger La Manche
Challenger La Manche
2013 in French tennis
February 2013 sports events in France
March 2013 sports events in France